The Road America 100 was an ARCA Menards Series race held at the Road America in Elkhart Lake, Wisconsin. It was originally 161.920 miles, but was shortened to 101 miles. It supported the NASCAR Xfinity Series Henry 180 in 2013 and 2017.

Past winners

ARCA Menards Series

References

External links 
 

2013 establishments in Wisconsin
ARCA Menards Series races
Motorsport in Wisconsin
Recurring sporting events established in 2013
Recurring sporting events disestablished in 2017